Cooks Beach (Pukaki) is a town on a three-kilometre white-sand beach on the Coromandel Peninsula of New Zealand. To its north is Cooks Bay, and beyond that is Mercury Bay. To the east is the locality of Hahei and the tourist attraction of Cathedral Cove. On the northwest, Shakespeare Cliff is a scenic reserve with a lookout point.

History

The harbour is one of the earliest places settled by Māori, with Kupe landing on the shore in the fourteenth century. Te Arawa arrived later bringing a leader called Hei, resulting in the local iwi of Ngāti Hei. The bay was called Whanganui-o-hei, the great bay of Hei.

James Cook visited the area in November 1769, and chose the eastern end of Cooks Beach to set up his instruments to observe the transit of Mercury. He named the bay Mercury Bay. A granite monument later set up to honour him was washed into the sea by a storm and erosion in 2018, but replaced in time for the 250th anniversary the following year.

In 1837, Ranulph Dacre and Gordon Browne purchased almost all the land of Cooks Beach, which became known as Dacre's Grant. A timber mill and a flax mill were established, and up to 30 families settled to farm, collect kauri gum, and fish. Plans to subdivide the land in the 1920s were postponed due to the Great Depression until after World War II. Farming moved into the hills, which had previously been unsuitable due to low phosphate levels, but aerial topdressing made the land economic.

Ferry Landing
About 2.5 km northwest of the centre of Cooks Beach is Ferry Landing, a smaller settlement on Whakapenui Point between Maramaratotara Bay and Whitianga Harbour. This was the site of a Ngāti Hei pā, which was sacked by Ngāi Te Rangi in the mid 18th century. Cook was impressed by the ruins when visited on 11 November 1769.

A passenger ferry runs on a ten-minute schedule between Ferry Landing and Whitianga during the day. The ferry has operated since 1895.

Demographics

Cooks Beach-Ferry Landing had a population of 459 at the 2018 New Zealand census, an increase of 111 people (31.9%) since the 2013 census, and an increase of 144 people (45.7%) since the 2006 census. There were 189 households, comprising 219 males and 240 females, giving a sex ratio of 0.91 males per female. The median age was 59.2 years (compared with 37.4 years nationally), with 54 people (11.8%) aged under 15 years, 45 (9.8%) aged 15 to 29, 198 (43.1%) aged 30 to 64, and 168 (36.6%) aged 65 or older.

Ethnicities were 95.4% European/Pākehā, 5.9% Māori, 2.6% Pacific peoples, 1.3% Asian, and 2.0% other ethnicities. People may identify with more than one ethnicity.

The percentage of people born overseas was 17.6, compared with 27.1% nationally.

Although some people chose not to answer the census's question about religious affiliation, 56.2% had no religion, 33.3% were Christian and 3.9% had other religions.

Of those at least 15 years old, 81 (20.0%) people had a bachelor's or higher degree, and 69 (17.0%) people had no formal qualifications. The median income was $27,500, compared with $31,800 nationally. 45 people (11.1%) earned over $70,000 compared to 17.2% nationally. The employment status of those at least 15 was that 123 (30.4%) people were employed full-time, 81 (20.0%) were part-time, and 6 (1.5%) were unemployed.

References

Thames-Coromandel District